John F. Dyler  (June 5, 1852 – August 16, 1916) was a professional baseball player who played outfield in the Major Leagues for the 1882 Louisville Eclipse.

External links

1852 births
1916 deaths
Major League Baseball outfielders
Louisville Eclipse players
19th-century baseball players
Evansville Red players
Baseball players from Kentucky